A provincial by-election was held in Nova Scotia on 2 October 2007 to fill the vacancy in the House of Assembly riding of Cole Harbour-Eastern Passage. The byelection resulted from the resignation of New Democrat MLA Kevin Deveaux. New Democrat Becky Kent won the byelection by almost 600 votes.

|-
 
|New Democratic Party
|Becky Kent
|align="right"|2,459
|align="right"|44.39
|align="right"|
|-
 
|Progressive Conservative Party
|Michael Eddy
|align="right"|1,863
|align="right"|33.63
|align="right"|
|-
 
|Liberal Party
|Kelly Rambeau
|align="right"|958
|align="right"|17.30
|align="right"|
|-

|}

References

2007 elections in Canada
2007 in Nova Scotia

Provincial by-elections in Nova Scotia